Gerren Keith (born March 18, 1941, in Kansas City, Missouri) is an American television director.

Keith's career began in 1963 serving as the stage manager for the game show Let's Make a Deal. He then stage managed for The Red Skelton Show and The Flip Wilson Show. He made his directorial debut with the sitcom, Grady, a spin-off of Sanford and Son. He then went on to direct episodes of Good Times, Diff'rent Strokes, 227 and Martin, directing the majority of those sitcoms respectively. His other television credits include Valerie, Growing Pains, Family Matters, The Wayans Bros., The Parent 'Hood, The Jamie Foxx Show, Just Shoot Me!, The Parkers and That's So Raven.

Personal life
Keith was married to Marian Depass from 1965 to 1968. He then married actress and agent Laura Shuman in 1985. They were married until Shuman's death in 2002. Together, they had two children.

References

External links 
 

1941 births
Living people
African-American television directors
American television directors
People from Kansas City, Missouri
University of Missouri–Kansas City alumni
21st-century African-American people
20th-century African-American people